Montclair High School is a comprehensive four-year public high school located in Montclair, in Essex County, New Jersey, United States, serving students in ninth through twelfth grades as the lone secondary school of the Montclair Public School District. The school has been accredited by the Middle States Association of Colleges and Schools Commission on Elementary and Secondary Schools since 1928.

As of the 2021–22 school year, the school had an enrollment of 1,998 students and 154.6 classroom teachers (on an FTE basis), for a student–teacher ratio of 12.9:1. There were 249 students (12.5% of enrollment) eligible for free lunch and 46 (2.3% of students) eligible for reduced-cost lunch.

Background

Founded in 1886, MHS quickly outgrew its original location (torn down in the 1930s) on Orange Road, the site of which is now the field of Hillside School. The current "Main Building" was then opened, and it is one of the older public high schools in New Jersey. It initially was only the "Main Building," as it is colloquially referred to, but as time went on and the enrollment grew, the board of education allowed the high school to annex George Inness Junior High School across the street, which is called "the Annex" or the "Freshman Building", in which many of the ninth grade classes take place.

Grounds
The school holds classes in two buildings on opposite sides of Park Street. The Main Building of the high school is located on the west side of Park Street, and the George Inness Annex, also known as the Freshman Building, is located on the east side of the street. Traffic is stopped eight times a day for five minutes between periods to allow students to cross the street. Many fences and a crosswalk have been installed to restrict the students' routes to a  meter path. Gym classes are sometimes held at Woodman Field of Essex Park, two blocks away, and otherwise in the school's four gymnasiums.

Montclair High School has an outdoor amphitheatre through which a brook flows, which is where graduation ceremonies are held, weather permitting.  The amphitheater is also the site of pep rallies, concerts, and public movie showings. The brook is Toney's Brook, which also runs through Rand Park.

Awards, recognition, and rankings
The school was the 120th-ranked public high school in New Jersey out of 339 schools statewide in New Jersey Monthly magazine's September 2014 cover story on the state's "Top Public High Schools", using a new ranking methodology. The school had been ranked 99th in the state of 328 schools in 2012, after being ranked 94th in 2010 out of 322 schools. The magazine ranked the school 85th in 2008 out of 316 schools. The school was ranked 90th in the magazine's September 2006 issue, which included 316 schools.

Schooldigger.com ranked the school 201st out of 376 public high schools statewide in its 2010 rankings (a decrease of 56 positions from the 2009 rank), which were based on the combined percentage of students classified as proficient or above proficient on the language arts literacy and mathematics components of the High School Proficiency Assessment (HSPA).

In Newsweeks May 22, 2007, issue, ranking the country's top high schools, Montclair High School was listed in 896th place, the 24th-highest ranked school in New Jersey. The school was listed in 214th place, the eighth-highest-ranked school in New Jersey, in Newsweeks May 8, 2006, issue, listing the Top 1,200 High Schools in the United States.

In 2001, Montclair High School came in 2nd place in the National High School Mock Trial Championships held in Omaha, Nebraska. and was the New Jersey High School Mock Trial champion in 2006 and was named co-champion with Bordentown Regional High School in 2020 after the finals were cancelled due to the COVID-19 pandemic.

Montclair High School's Fed Challenge Team has ranked first in the New York Region eight times, and won the National Fed Challenge Championship in 2001.

In 2005, the Montclair High School FIRST Robotics Competition Team 555 won the Arizona Regional in Phoenix, Arizona. They also won second place in the New York City Regional, as well as the web design award and the Johnson & Johnson Sportsmanship award. The team then won the Johnson & Johnson Sportsmanship award at the FIRST Championship in Atlanta, Georgia. In 2007, the team won the Denver Regional and the Regional Rockwell Automation Innovation in Control Award in Denver, Colorado. In 2008, they won the New York City Regional and went to the quarterfinals at the FIRST Championship in Atlanta.

In 2007, 2009, and 2016, MHS won the Euro Challenge championship.

In 2009 and 2013, seniors of the Civics and Government Institute at Montclair High placed 2nd in the state at the We the People: The Citizen and the Constitution competition held in Trenton, New Jersey. The 2013 team qualified for the We the People national finals in Washington D.C., but were unable to attend due to budgetary concerns.

In 2009, 2011, and 2012, the members of the Model Congress/Model United Nations Club won "Best Delegation" at the University of Pennsylvania Model Congress Conference.

"Humanities" and "Philosophy and Composition" teacher Gregory Woodruff was named "Humanities Teacher of the Year" by the New Jersey Council for the Humanities in 2010, for teaching highly rigorous classes in classical and contemporary literature and philosophy. He was awarded the Weston Award in 2011.

Athletics
The Montclair High School Mounties compete in the Super Essex Conference, which includes public and private high schools in Essex County and was established following a reorganization of sports leagues in Northern New Jersey by the New Jersey State Interscholastic Athletic Association (NJSIAA). Until the NJSIAA's 2009 realignment, the school participated in Division B of the Northern New Jersey Interscholastic League, which was comprised of high schools located in Bergen County, Essex County, and Passaic County, and was separated into three divisions based on NJSIAA size classification. With 1,596 students in grades 10–12, the school was classified by the NJSIAA for the 2019–20 school year as Group IV for most athletic competition purposes, which included schools with an enrollment of 1,060 to 5,049 students in that grade range. The football team competes in the Liberty White division of the North Jersey Super Football Conference, which includes 112 schools in 20 divisions, making it the nation's biggest football-only high school sports league. The school was classified by the NJSIAA as Group V North for football for 2018–20. Montclair's sports programs include rowing, baseball, football, lacrosse, soccer, ice hockey, basketball, volleyball, softball, track and field, fencing, golf, cross country, field hockey, gymnastics, swimming, wrestling, tennis, and bowling.

MHS expanded and refurnished its field house at Woodman Field in Essex Park. The field house houses restrooms, locker rooms, and meeting areas for many of the Montclair sports teams, in particular football. Completed for the 2008–09 school year at an estimated cost of $5 million, the field house accommodates a new, state-of-the-art weight lifting gym with glass walls looking over Woodman Field, a film screening room for the Montclair Mounties football team, and observation rooms looking over Woodman Field. After receiving a pledge from the Furlong family of $3 million towards the project, the Furlong Field House at Montclair High School was constructed, with a ribbon cutting ceremony in October 2008.

The baseball team won the North II Group IV state sectional championship titles in 1959, 1961, 1963, and 1964. The team won the Greater Newark Tournament in 1942, 1948, 1954, 1963, 2012, and 2019; the program's six titles were the third-most in tournament history as of 2019. The team won the Greater Newark Tournament in 2019, beating Seton Hall Preparatory School by a score of 12-1 under the mercy rule.

The boys fencing team was the épée team winner in 2013, 2014, and 2016.

Former Montclair High School fencing team captain (and U.S. Olympic men's fencing team alternate member) Alen Hadzic was temporarily suspended from competition June 2, 2021, by the United States Center for SafeSport, due to allegations against him of rape and other sexual misconduct, and disqualified from participating in the Tokyo Summer Olympics the following month unless his suspension is overturned; he was also formerly suspended from Columbia University for a year based on a sexual misconduct investigation against him.

The girls fencing team was the épée team winner in 2016, 2017, and 2018.

The girls' field hockey team won the North II Group IV state sectional title in 1980, 1982, 1985, 1986, 1988, and 1990, and won the North I Group IV title in 2003, 2004, 2010, 2012, and 2014. The team won the Group IV state championship in 1980 and 1985. The 1980 team finished the season 13-3-3 after winning the Group IV title with a 3–0 win against Toms River High School North in the tournament final at Mercer County Park.

The football team won the North II Group IV state sectional championships in 1983, 1994, 1996, and 2002, and won the North I Group V state title in 2012, 2013, 2014, and 2017. In 2014, the team won their third consecutive North I, Group V state title, with a 26–14 win against Passaic County Technical Institute in the final game of the tournament, played at MetLife Stadium. In 2017, the team won the North I Group V state sectional championship, the program's eighth state title, with a 35–14 win against Union City High School in the tournament final. In October 2008, a Montclair High School football player, Ryne Dougherty, died as a result of a brain hemorrhage in a football game. The school's football rivalry with Bloomfield High School was listed at 19th on NJ.com's 2017 list "Ranking the 31 fiercest rivalries in N.J. HS football". Bloomfield was the stronger school in the initial years of the competition, with Montclair dominating since the early 1980s and leading the rivalry with a 69-26-1 overall record as of 2017.

The hockey team has won the overall state championship in 1981 (defeating Brick Township High School by a score of 6–5 in the tournament final), 1987 (defeating Delbarton School 4–2), and 1988 (defeating St. Joseph (Montvale) 2–1). They won the public school state championship in 1995 (defeating Chatham High School 2–1 in overtime). Towards the end of every hockey season, the Montclair Mounties host the "Montclair Cup". Every year, at Clary Anderson Arena (the Mounties' home hockey arena), Montclair High School faces off against in-town rival, Montclair Kimberley Academy. The MKA team won the 2011, 2012, and 2013 games.

The boys' lacrosse team won the overall state championship in 1974 and 1975 (defeating Boonton High School both years in the tournament final), 1977, and 1978 (vs. Columbia High School both years), 1980 (vs. Columbia), 1984 (vs. Bridgewater-Raritan High School East), 1985 (vs. Westfield High School), 1992 (vs. Ridgewood High School) and 1997 (vs. Mountain Lakes High School), and won the Group IV state championship in 2010 (vs. Bridgewater-Raritan High School). The 10 state titles won by the program were tied for fourth-most of any school in the state as of 2020. The 1974 team finished the season with a 13–2 record after winning the inaugural NJSIAA state championship with a 9–2 victory against Boonton. The 1975 team repeated as state champion with a 10–3 win against Boonton in front of a crowd of 2,000. The 1984 team finished the season with a 16–2 record after winning the program's sixth state title with a 12–6 win against Bridgewater-Raritan,

The rowing team has had success in New Jersey and nationally. The girls' lightweight 4x placed 3rd at nationals in 2016. In 2017, Montclair won the men's and women's Garden State Scholastics points trophies, the first public school to do so. Later in the season, the Men's Senior 8+ became Stotesbury Regatta Champions, a first for the program, making history as the first public high school boat to win the Stotesbury Cup in a decade. The Second Varsity 8+ placed third. The boat also became Scholastic Rowing Association of America National Champions  and National Schools Rowing Association National Champions.

The girls' soccer team won the Group IV state title in 2014, defeating Hunterdon Central Regional High School by a score of 2–1 in the tournament final to capture the program's first state title and finish the season with a 22–1 record.

The boys' tennis team won the overall state championship in 1953 vs. William L. Dickinson High School (Jersey City).

The boys track team won the spring track title as Group IV champion in 1924–1926, 1928–1932, 1935, 1938, 1939, 1942, 1943 (as co-champion), 1946, 1952–1956, 1958, 1972 and 1974; the team's 21 state titles are the second-most of any team in the state. The boys track team was indoor public champion in 1931 and won the Group IV title in 1967 and 1985 (as co-champion).

Clubs and activities
As of the 2021–22 school year, Montclair High School had 107 clubs.

Performing arts
Montclair High School's performing arts program is called the School of Visual and Performing Arts (SVPA). The program includes a Dance Company for elite dancers, Technical Theater for those interested in behind-the-scenes work, and other activities. Most performances take place in the theater in Inness Annex, called the "Little Theater." Some productions include the Fall Showcase, a musical revue, and a musical, performed in the spring of each school year.

Montclair High School also has both a string orchestra and a winds band.  The MHS band marches and performs for football games and has annually served as the pep band for college basketball teams in Madison Square Garden.

Student protests
Students protested New Jersey Governor Chris Christie's appearance on school grounds on March 30, 2010, in response to ensuing budget cuts that affected the school.
Over 200 students walked out of their classes in protests of the budget cuts in April of the same year.

Popular culture 

Montclair High School has been featured in or used as a filming location for films, commercials, and television shows, including:
 The original 1950 film version of Cheaper by the Dozen
 Swimfan
 Mean Girls
 Ed – NBC series
 The Sopranos – HBO series
 Imaginary Heroes
 Seven Minutes in Heaven
 NBA back to school commercials – featuring many famous basketball stars
 Lymelife (2009) – featuring Emma Roberts, Cynthia Nixon and Alec Baldwin

Administration
The school's principal is Jeffrey A. Freeman. His core administration team includes four assistant principals.

Notable alumni

 Buzz Aldrin (born 1930), astronaut who was the second person to step on the Moon.
 Josh Allen (born 1997), outside linebacker for the Jacksonville Jaguars.
 Albert Anderson (born 1950), guitarist and songwriter; played with Bob Marley & The Wailers, The Wailers Band, Peter Tosh, Black Uhuru, Lauryn Hill, Ben Harper, The Centurions, Traffic and UB40
 Yael Averbuch (born 1986), soccer player.
 Me'Lisa Barber (born 1980), sprinter
 Lezli Baskerville (born 1956), lawyer who has served as president and CEO of the National Association for Equal Opportunity in Higher Education.
 Wendy Benchley (born 1941, class of 1959), marine and environmental conservation advocate and former elected official who was the wife of author Peter Benchley.
 Dale Berra (born 1956), infielder who played in Major League Baseball from 1977 to 1987.
 Clarence Birdseye (1886-1956), founder of the modern frozen food industry
 Virginia Lee Block (1902–1970), psychologist who contributed to studies regarding child and adolescent psychology.
 Alvin Bowen (born 1983), gridiron football linebacker who played in the NFL for the Jacksonville Jaguars.
 Bill Byrne (1940–2021), American football guard who played professional football for the Philadelphia Eagles.
 David Caldwell (born 1987, class of 2005), football safety who played in the NFL for the Indianapolis Colts.
 Ernestine Gilbreth Carey (1908–2006), daughter of Frank Bunker Gilbreth and Lillian Moller Gilbreth, and co-author of Cheaper by the Dozen
 Nanette Carter (born 1954), artist and college educator, best known for her collages with paper, canvas and Mylar.
 Wally Choice (1932-2018, class of 1952), basketball player who played professionally with the Harlem Globetrotters
 Harold L. Colburn Jr. (1925–2012), physician and politician who served in the New Jersey General Assembly representing the 8th Legislative District from 1984 to 1995.
 Leonard S. Coleman Jr. (born 1949), last president of the National League, serving from 1994 until 1999 when the position was eliminated by Major League Baseball
 Kyle Copeland (born 1961), former professional tennis player.
 Allen B. DuMont (1901–1965, class of 1919), television pioneer
 Avery Ellis (born 1994), professional Canadian football defensive lineman for the Ottawa Redblacks of the Canadian Football League.
 Lola Flash (born 1959), large-scale photographer
 Buddy Fortunato (born 1946), newspaper publisher and politician who served four terms in the New Jersey General Assembly.
 Frank Bunker Gilbreth Jr. (1911–2001), son of Frank Bunker Gilbreth and Lillian Moller Gilbreth, and co-author of Cheaper by the Dozen
 Nia H. Gill (born 1948), politician who has represented the 34th Legislative District in the New Jersey State Senate since 2002.
 Syd Goldsmith (born 1938, class of 1956), writer and diplomat who has been featured in the South China Morning Post.
 Mule Haas (1903-1974), Major League Baseball centerfielder from 1925 to 1938.
 Evan Stephens Hall (born 1989), musician best known as frontman of the indie rock band Pinegrove.
 J. Henry Harrison (1878–1943), lawyer and politician who represented Essex County in the New Jersey Senate.
 Jordan Harrod (born 1996, class of 2014), research scientist and YouTuber who works on neuroengineering, brain-machine interfaces, and machine learning for medicine.
 Russ Heath (1926–2018, class of 1945), cartoonist best known for his comic book work with DC Comics.
 Myisha Hines-Allen (born 1996), professional basketball player who plays for the Washington Mystics of the WNBA.
 Charles B. Johnson (born 1933, class of 1950), businessman.
 Rees Jones (born 1941), golf course architect.
 Robert Trent Jones Jr. (born 1939, class of 1957), golf course architect.
 J. Erik Jonsson (1901-1995), businessman, philanthropist, and former mayor of Dallas, Texas.
 Julie Kane (born 1952), Poet Laureate of Louisiana, 2011–2013
 Daniel Karcher (born 1964), NPR host and filmmaker, best known as host on WBGO and production of The Blair Witch Project and Family Guy
 John A. Kenney Jr. (1914-2003), pioneering African-American dermatologist who specialized in the study of skin disorders affecting racial minorities, earning him recognition as the "dean of black dermatology".
 Kenneth Lamott (1923–1979, class of 1940), writer
 Nicole Leach (born 1979), actress
 Aubrey Lewis (1935–2001, class of 1954), football and track star with the Notre Dame Fighting Irish who was selected by The Star-Ledger as its Football Player of the Century
 Warren Littlefield (born 1952), former President of NBC Entertainment
 Andrew Lombard (born 1997), footballer who plays as a defender for the New York Red Bulls II in the United Soccer League.
 Anne McCaffrey (1926–2011), author of science fiction and fantasy novels
 John McMullen (1918–2005), former owner of the New Jersey Devils and Houston Astros
 John Miller, journalist who interviewed Osama Bin Laden
 Jeff Mills (born 1968), linebacker who played four seasons in the NFL with the San Diego Chargers and Denver Broncos
 Mackenzie Molner (born 1988), chess grandmaster and instructor.
 Julia Phillips (born 1989, class of 2006), author whose book Disappearing Earth was a finalist for the 2019 National Book Award for Fiction.
 Christina Ricci (born 1980), actress
 Rosemary Rice (1925–2012), actress best known for her role as Katrin on CBS-TV series Mama.
 Anwar Robinson (born 1979), American Idol finalist
 Ben Rosenfield (born 1992), actor.
 Adam Schlesinger (1967-2020), bassist for the band Fountains of Wayne
 Robert Crooks Stanley (1876–1951), former chairman and president of International Nickel Company, known for discovering the alloy Monel
 Benjamin Strong Jr. (born 1872), first governor of the Federal Reserve Bank of New York
 Bob Torrey (1878-1941), football player and coach who was the captain of the University of Pennsylvania's unbeaten teams of 1904 and 1905 and was elected to the College Football Hall of Fame in 1971.
 David Tyree (born 1980), wide receiver, played for the New York Giants
 Joe Walsh (born 1947), musician with the Eagles
 Ingrid Wells (born 1989), soccer player
 Richard Wilbur (born 1921, class of 1938), former United States Poet Laureate; won the Pulitzer Prize and National Book Award
 Earl Williams (1948-2013), MLB catcher who earned the National League's Rookie of the Year award in 1971.
 Alex Winter (born 1965), actor, best known for his role in Bill & Ted's Excellent Adventure

References

External links 
 Montclair High School webpages
 Montclair Public Schools
 
 School Data for the Montclair Public Schools, National Center for Education Statistics

Middle States Commission on Secondary Schools
Montclair, New Jersey
Public high schools in Essex County, New Jersey